The 2017 Women's African Nations Championship was the 18th edition of the Women's African Volleyball Championship organised by Africa's governing volleyball body, the Confédération Africaine de Volleyball. Held in Yaoundé, Cameroon, the tournament took place from 7 to 14 October 2017. The top two teams, who had registered with FIVB for the 2018 World Championship, qualify to represent Africa in the 2018 FIVB Volleyball Women's World Championship.

Cameroon won the championship defeating Kenya and Egypt won the bronze medal over Senegal.

Qualification

13 teams registered to participate in the 2017 Women's African Nations Championship, of which 4 later withdrew.

* Withdrew.

Venue

Format
The tournament is played in two stages. In the first stage, the participants are divided in two groups. A single round-robin format is played within each group to determine the teams' group position (as per procedure below).
 
The two best teams of each group progress to the second stage, the second stage of the tournament consists of a single-elimination, with winners advancing to the next round until the final round.

Pool standing procedure
 Number of matches won
 Match points
 Sets ratio
 Points ratio
 Result of the last match between the tied teams

Match won 3–0 or 3–1: 3 match points for the winner, 0 match points for the loser
Match won 3–2: 2 match points for the winner, 1 match point for the loser

Pools composition
The drawing of lots was held in Yaoundé, Cameroon, on 6 October 2017.

Preliminary round
 All times are West Africa Time (UTC+01:00).

Pool A

|}

Pool B

|}

Final round
 All times are West Africa Time (UTC+01:00).

Classification round

Fifth place playoffs

|}

Seventh place match

|}

Fifth place match

|}

Championship round

Semifinals

|}

Third place match

|}

Final

|}

Final standing

Source: CAVB.

Individual awards

Most Valuable Player
 Laetitia Moma Bassoko
Best Setter
 Koulla Nadge
Best Receiver
 Fatou Diouck
Best Libero
 Raïssa Nasser

Best Attacker
 Mercy Moim
Best Blocker
 Edith Wisa Mukuvulani
Best Server
 Aya Elshamy

Source: CAVB.

See also
 2017 Men's African Volleyball Championship

References
 Official CAVB match results.

External links

2017 Women
African Women's Volleyball Championship
Women's African Volleyball Championship
2017 in Cameroonian sport
International sports competitions hosted by Cameroon
Volleyball in Cameroon
Sport in Yaoundé
Women's African Volleyball Championship
Events in Yaoundé